Albania has an embassy in Copenhagen, and Denmark has an embassy in Tirana. About 8,000 Albanians live in Denmark. Both countries are members of NATO. Also Albania is an EU candidate and Denmark is an EU member. Diplomatic relations were established in 1970. On 23 June 1971, a trade agreement was signed.

High level visits
In 2006, Danish Foreign Minister Per Stig Møller visited Albania. The visit focused on cooperation and political issues. 3 million DKK were allocated on human rights and good governance.

In May 2012, Danish Foreign Minister Villy Søvndal and Minister of European Affairs Nicolai Wammen met with the Albanian Vice-President and Foreign Minister Edmond Haxhinasto in Denmark, to discuss the situation in Kosovo.

Assistance and cooperation
After the fall of the communist Albania, Denmark assisted with the building institutions and aid to the poor parts of Albania.

Denmark also assists Albania with civil society and independent media. Albania is part of the Danish South East Europe Programme. 73 million DKK has been given to the programme. In September 2009, a programme for sustainable business development was launched.

In 2006, Denmark signed an agreement to assist Albania implementing the Clean Development Mechanism (CDM) protocol and help reduce their emission of greenhouse gasses.

After the 2010 Albania floods, Denmark contributed with fodder and Danish ambassador for Albania, Karsten Ankjær Jensen said "It is vital that all good forces unite to help alleviate the disaster and suffering endured by everyone in the flooded areas. Hopefully our efforts will provide relief and ensure the livelihood of the affected farmers."

In September 2012, Christian Friis Bach visited Albania and Kosovo for the democratic and economic development.

References

See also

 
Denmark
Bilateral relations of Denmark